Cymindis transversa is a species of ground beetle in the subfamily Harpalinae. It was described by Morvan in 1972.

References

transversa
Beetles described in 1972